Cinema Service was a South Korean film production and distribution company.

History
The company was founded in 1993 by film director Kang Woo-suk as "Kang Woo-suk Productions", before taking the name Cinema Service in 1995. It survived during the Asian financial crisis and was in position to take advantage of the popularity boom of Korean cinema, becoming a major player in the East Asian film industry.

In 2000, Cinema Service merged with Locus Holdings (later Plenus Entertainment).

In 2005, the founder Kang Woo-suk relinquished his position at the company, wanting to concentrate more on his personal film projects. Plenus Entertainment merged with CJ Entertainment and Cinema Service became independent of the Plenus Entertainment, and later on merged with CJ Entertainment.

In 2006, Cinema Service was merged with CJ Entertainment.

In 2008, Cinema Service exited the movie publishing and distribution business to focus on movie production until 2014. Now, all Cinema Service films are distributed by CJ Entertainment.

In 2016, the company closed down for unknown reasons.

See also
 CJ E&M Pictures
 Cinema of Korea
 Contemporary culture of South Korea
 Korean Wave

References

External links 
  

Film distributors of South Korea
Mass media companies established in 1993
Mass media companies disestablished in 2016
Film production companies of South Korea
Companies based in Seoul